TSS Scotia was a twin screw steamer passenger vessel operated by the London and North Western Railway from 1921 to 1923, and the London, Midland and Scottish Railway from 1923 to 1940.

History

She was built by William Denny and Brothers of Dumbarton and launched in 1920.

On 1 June 1940 she was bombed by German aircraft during the Dunkirk evacuation. The destroyer HMS Esk came alongside and rescued nearly 1,000 troops. The destroyer HMS Worcester was nearby and also picked up some survivors. Twenty eight of her crew and an estimated 200 to 300 French troops were killed.

References

1920 ships
Passenger ships of the United Kingdom
Steamships
Ships built on the River Clyde
Ships of the London and North Western Railway
Maritime incidents in June 1940
Ships sunk by German aircraft
World War II shipwrecks in the North Sea